Manifest is the sixth studio album by the Swedish-Danish heavy metal band Amaranthe. It was released on 2 October 2020 via Nuclear Blast.

The album features guest appearances from Noora Louhimo of Battle Beast, Perttu Kivilaakso of Apocalyptica, Elias Holmlid of Dragonland, and Heidi Shepherd of Butcher Babies.

In an interview with HeadBangers Lifestyle, the band's guitarist and keyboardist Olof Mörck revealed that the album version of "Do or Die" will only contain Nils Molin's male clean vocals and Henrik Englund Wilhemsson's unclean vocals, while the single version of the song, which will appear as a bonus track on the album, only contains Elize Ryd's female clean vocals and Angela Gossow's harsh vocals. The guitar solo by Jeff Loomis appears on both versions of the song. It is also the final album to feature Wilhemsson before his departure from the band on June 8, 2022.

Track listing

Notes
 "Boom!1" is stylized in all caps.

Personnel

Amaranthe
 Olof Mörck – guitars, keyboards, synthesizers, co-production, mixing
 Elize Ryd – clean vocals (female)
 Morten Løwe Sørensen – drums
 Johan Andreassen – bass
 Henrik "GG6" Englund – unclean vocals
 Nils Molin – clean vocals (male)

Guest musicians
 Noora Louhimo (Battle Beast) – vocals on "Strong"
 Perttu Kivilaakso (Apocalyptica) – cello on "Crystalline" (both versions)
 Elias Holmlid (Dragonland) – keys on "Crystalline" (both versions)
 Heidi Shepherd (Butcher Babies) – spoken word vocals on "Boom!1"
 Jeff Loomis (Arch Enemy) – guitar solo on "Do or Die" (both versions)
 Angela Gossow (ex-Arch Enemy) – harsh vocals on "Do or Die" (single version)

Production
 Jacob Hansen – producer, engineer, mixing, mastering
 Joonas Parkkonen – engineer
 Johan Carlén – photography
 Emmanuel Shiu – album cover art
 Travis Smith – booklet art and design

Charts

Notes

References

2020 albums
Amaranthe albums
Nuclear Blast albums
Albums produced by Jacob Hansen